São Paulo is a painting by Portuguese Renaissance artist Nuno Gonçalves, created c. 1470-1480. It represents the Apostle Paul, seated and dressed in red, the colour of martyrdom, holding up a sword, with a book on his lap. It is held at the National Museum of Ancient Art, in Lisbon.

References
IMC-IP São Paulo de Nuno Gonçalves

1470s paintings
1480s paintings
Paintings by Nuno Gonçalves
Paintings depicting Paul the Apostle
Paintings in the collection of the National Museum of Ancient Art